Catchphrase is a British game show based on the short-lived American game show of the same name. It originally aired on ITV in the United Kingdom between 12 January 1986 and 23 April 2004. A currently running revival premiered on ITV on 7 April 2013.

Catchphrase was presented by Northern Irish comedian Roy Walker from its 1986 premiere until 1999, airing weekly at night. Nick Weir took the programme over in 2000 and hosted it until the end of series 16 on 23 April 2004. Mark Curry replaced Weir for the final series, which moved to a daytime slot and ran from 24 June to 19 December 2002.

On 27 August 2012, a revived pilot was made by STV Studios and Digital Rights Group (DRG) with new host Stephen Mulhern. The original format remains, although there are now three contestants instead of two, and the show has also been updated with new 3D graphics and a new concluding game. On 9 October 2012, ITV announced that it had ordered a full series after a successful pilot.

In the original series, two contestants, one male and one female, standing in blue lectern and red lectern, (in the Roy Walker era), and the purple lectern and orange lectern (in the Nick Weir/Mark Curry era) would have to identify the familiar phrase represented by a piece of animation accompanied by background music. The show's mascot, a golden robot called "Mr. Chips", appears in many of the animations. In the revived version of the show, the same format remains, but there are three contestants and there is no particular attention paid to gender.

Catchphrase was a creation of Steve Radosh, who created the American series that the British programme was derived from; due to this, he is given credit for creating this show as well (as was producer Marty Pasetta and distributor Telepictures).

Format

Main game
In the main game, at the start of each standard round, one contestant stopped a randomiser consisting of money amounts by hitting their button. The value landed on would be the amount for the normal catchphrases in that round. At first, the minimum value for the first two rounds was £10 and £20 in each round thereafter. After the second episode, the minimum value reduced to £5 until 1994. The maximum value started at £50 in round one and increased £50 for each round thereafter. During the first five series, the maximum value remained at £150 from round three onward. In series 10, the values were £35 to £75 in the first round and £35 to £100 in round two. From series 11 to 13, the values were £50 to £100 in round one and £60 to £125 in round two.

In the Nick Weir series, there was no money randomiser; the cash prize was set as default to £100 in round 1 and £150 in round 2. In Weir's third and final series, the round 2 amount for a normal catchphrase was doubled to £200, and for the final series with Mark Curry, these were replaced with the corresponding points values.

The cash prizes of £100 and £200 respectively for the two standard rounds were retained for the revived Mulhern series in 2013. A third round was played in the celebrity special, where the cash prizes were worth £300.

Qualifying round
For the revived 2013 series, three contestants start the game instead of two. An extra round was therefore added in which the three contestants compete to guess catchphrases on the screen. The first two contestants to correctly guess three catchphrases would advance to the main game. This round is not used in the celebrity specials. In the first three revival series, contestants were frozen out if they gave an incorrect catchphrase.

Normal Catchphrase
For the first round, the computer would slowly draw a catchphrase on the screen accompanied by background music (the 2013 series uses CGI computer animation). When most of the catchphrase had been revealed, a bell would sound and the contestants could then buzz in and try to guess the answer. If the player that buzzed in guessed incorrectly, the other player would be offered the chance to guess. If a player guessed correctly, he/she would win the predetermined amount and then have a chance to solve the bonus catchphrase.

When Nick Weir took over as host in 2000, not only would contestants win the money allocated but they would also win spot prizes if a sound was played after the contestant guessed a catchphrase correctly. During the 2001 series, this new feature was changed, with the (now different) sound to indicate a spot prize could be won being played before the catchphrase was shown, this was carried over into the revived Mulhern series. In Weir's last series, the spot prizes were removed and instead, one catchphrase in the first half of the game was also worth a 'Travel Bonus' prize, which was generally a weekend/short break away in a European city. If one player got a normal catchphrase wrong and the other player incorrectly guesses the same catchphrase, the game would just continue with neither player getting the predetermined amount of money or a chance at solving the bonus catchphrase. There was no bell used for the first half of the game for the Weir/Curry/Mulhern era.

Bonus Catchphrase
A correct answer won the contestant the predetermined money amount, plus a chance to solve the bonus catchphrase, which was hidden behind nine squares with the show's logo on each (or random shapes in the Nick Weir/Mark Curry era). The contestant chose a square by hitting their buzzer to stop a randomiser on one of them. That square was then removed, and the contestant had five seconds to come up with an answer. If they were right, they won the amount of money in the bonus bank.

In series 1, the bonus bank would start at £100 and increase by £100 each round for the first two episodes and for the rest of that series, it would start at £50 and increase by £50 each round. However, in series 2, the bonus bank increased with each regular round, not counting the Ready Money Round. This format carried on from series 2 until series 9. In series 10 (the first Carlton series), it would start at £150 and increase by £50 each round, but £10 would be deducted for each square removed. From series 11 until series 15, it would start at £200 and increase by £50 each round, again with £10 deducted for each square removed but in series 16 (Nick Weir's third and final series), the bonus bank still started at £200 in round 1 and £400 in round 2. In rounds 1 and 2, it would still eliminate £10 for every random shape removed (Mark Curry's round 2 would deduct by 20 points on the 400 points bonus). In rounds three and four, the bank would start at £1,000 and reduce by £100 increments. For the final series (with Mark Curry), the pound values were replaced with corresponding point values.

Depending on how long it took to solve the bonus catchphrase, another game would be played with a higher possible amount in the randomiser and a larger amount in the bonus bank.

In the revived 2013 series, the bonus catchphrase is set at £500 for round 1 and £1,000 for round 2, but does not reduce when a square is removed (just like in the TVS years). On the celebrity specials, a third bonus catchphrase earned £1,500.

Ready Money/Countdown/Quickfire Round
From series 2, (the Roy Walker era) a new feature which was not seen in the US version, the "Ready Money Round", was introduced. This round followed a similar structure to a standard round, except that all catchphrases were worth a fixed amount of money (originally £50) and there was no bell, so the contestants could buzz in and answer them whenever they wished and as many times until the puzzle is solved or time runs out. In the TVS series from 1986 to 1994, this round was played only after the second normal round, subsequent rounds being played as standard with the bell and money randomiser. In the Carlton series from 1994 to 1999, however, all of the rounds in part two (up until the end of round klaxon) were ready money rounds. The amount for a normal catchphrase in the first Ready Money round increased to £100 for series 11 and £125 for series 12–13. From series 11–13, each catchphrase would be worth £150 in the second Ready Money round. If the end of round klaxon sounds and the bonus catchphrase had yet to be solved, the panels would be gradually removed until a player buzzed in with an answer. If neither player guessed correctly, a normal catchphrase would determine who won the bonus bank money.

In 2000, when Nick Weir took over as host, this round was replaced by the "Cash Countdown", in which the amount for each normal catchphrase started at £250 before quickly counting down £1 every .08 of a second. The quicker the contestants could answer, the more money they would win. In 2001, the starting value was increased to £500 minus £1 for each .04 of a second (£25 per second).

This round was retained in the Mark Curry series, but renamed the "Catchphrase Countdown" due to the show having abandoned pounds in favour of points.

The Mulhern series adopts a similar format to the "Ready Money Round", renaming it as the "Quickfire Round". All catchphrases in this round are worth £500, but no bonus catchphrase is played in this part of the game. The round instead ends straightaway upon the sounding of the time out klaxon.

The player with the most money won the game and played the Super Catchphrase. Both players kept their money. In the Curry series, the player with the most points won £250 but the player who didn't win was given a consolation prize, usually a digital camera.

Super Catchphrase
In the Super Catchphrase, the winning contestant faced a 5 × 5 board of 25 squares, each marked with a letter from A to Y in ascending order. The contestant chose a square and attempted to solve a catchphrase behind it. During the Roy Walker era, the aim was to get five squares in 60 seconds.

In the TVS years, if the contestant got five squares in such a way that they made a row or column (horizontally or vertically) on the board, they would win a prize such as a TV or a microwave oven. However, if they could make a row, column or diagonal through the central "M" square (which Walker often claimed was the most difficult), they would win a holiday somewhere in the world. If they ran out of time, they won a smaller prize (such as £25 in series 1 and from series 2 until 9, a camera or a food processor) for each correct square. However, from series 5 until 9, four or more correct answers awarded a more valuable consolation prize.

When Carlton picked up the show in 1994, the top prize remained a holiday, but the lesser prizes were replaced by cash. Each correct square was worth £50, while any five at random that did not make a row, column or diagonal through the "M" square earned a bonus £50. In early 1998, the amount for a correct square was doubled to £100 and the bonus was also doubled to £100. In late 1998, the bonus was worth £500. In series 10, the star prize was always a 21-day holiday for two around the world, flying to eight different locations. From series 11 onward, the star prize holiday was chosen by one of the contestants at random, using a similar style to the random money selector at the start of each game.

When Nick Weir took over as host in 2000, the format of the Super Catchphrase changed considerably. Now, in a similar fashion as on Blockbusters, the contestant had to make their way from the left-hand side of the board to the right (in a horizontal line), making adjoining moves and passing on a square meant that they would be blocked and would have to find an alternative path (excluding diagonals). This format was also used in the Mark Curry series. As before, the top prize was a holiday. In Weir's first series in 2000, the holiday randomiser remained, but from series 15 (2001), this was dropped and instead both contestants each nominated a location of their choice to go to if they won, revealed at the beginning of the show. In the Curry daytime series in 2002, this feature was still included but the choice was limited to somewhere in Europe, and these choices were revealed before the second round of the main game. Each square was worth £100 if the contestant was not successful in getting all the way across the board.

In series 10 until 14, a contestant who won the holiday was given extra money to spend, in series 10, it was £1,000, in series 11, it was £2,000, from series 12 to 14, it was £3,000.

In the Stephen Mulhern era, there are 15 numbered squares in the form of a pyramid (with 15 at the top) with each row, starting at the bottom, being worth a higher amount of money (£2,500/£5,000/£10,000/£25,000/£50,000). The bottom level contains the first five squares, the second contains four, and so on. Number 11 in the middle is starred and correctly answering it awards a bonus prize, which is usually a luxury holiday. (In the celebrity specials, correctly answering this catchphrase doubles the amount of money won by the other two celebrities for their chosen charities.) Starting from the bottom level, the winning player has 60 seconds to reach the highest level possible. Each square still contains a catchphrase; answering a catchphrase in a level correctly clears that level and allows the player to move to the next level. At the end of the round, the player receives the prize money of the level they have last cleared, plus the bonus prize (if Square 11 is cleared), along with their main game winnings.

Transmissions

Original

NB. Series 16 was recorded before Series 17 (Mark Curry's series) but transmitted after it.

Revival

Regular Series

Celebrity Series

Notable moments

"Snake charmer" (1994)
One of the most famous moments in the show's history included a ready money bonus catchphrase where the answer to the puzzle was "Snake charmer". However, the puzzle was uncovered in such a way which caused the audience, the contestants and host Roy Walker to laugh uncontrollably as the game went on as it appeared Mr. Chips and the snake were doing something sexual. Originally broadcast on 30 December 1994 as the ninth episode of series ten (production episode was listed as the fifth episode), this was edited in the original ITV broadcast, but it did appear two years later on the blooper show It'll Be Alright on the Night (the episode titled Alright on the Night's Cockup Trip, first aired on 12 October 1996).

"Dicing with death" (2014)
On the 2014 Mother's Day celebrity special, one of the Bonus Catchphrases was "Dicing with death". The first piece revealed was of a hand moving up and down in a rapid motion near the person's waist, making it look like the person may have been pleasuring himself. Like the aforementioned "Snake charmer" incident, this caused the entire studio to break out in laughter as the picture was revealed in a similar manner.

Theme music
Catchphrases original theme tune and incidental music were composed by television composer Ed Welch, whose original version of the theme was used for the TVS incarnation of the show, until 28 October 1994. It was also used on Family Catchphrase in 1994.

The show returned on 4 November 1994 with a brand new look and now being produced by Action Time for Carlton Television. The show's theme and incidental music was re-tuned, and was composed by Simon Etchell whose version was used from 1994 to 1999, with some slight alterations made in late 1998.

From 2000 to 2002, a third version of the Catchphrase theme music was used. It was a re-mixed and "jazzed-up" version of the previous theme, composed by Simon Etchell and was used alongside a revamped title sequence followed by a new studio set.

From 2013 onwards, a fourth version was introduced, based on Ed Welch's original theme and composed by Marc Sylvan and Richard Jacques. A new title sequence, logo and studio set was also created for the series.

Voiceovers
The first series was voiced by Andrew Lodge. Nick Jackson replaced him from series 2 until series 9 where the original TVS run ended. Ted Robbins took over the voiceover's mascot in series 10, followed by Charles Foster briefly in series 11 (Robbins later returned for series 12, but was not credited), and finally Robin Kermode during series 13, which was Walker's final series.

In the Weir era, Chris Jarvis was the show's announcer and in the Curry daytime series, Peter Dickson took over the role in series 17.

Since 2013, the voiceover has been provided by Jonathan Gould.

Games

A number of board game adaptations of Catchphrase were released over the years. Paul Lamond Games released the first edition in 1987, followed by a "Junior Edition" in 1990, and two separate editions by Britannia Games in 2001 and 2002. An adaptation based on the current series was released by Drumond Park in 2013, followed by Classic Catchphrase, released by Ideal in 2014. A Card Game was released by Marks & Spencer in 2016.

Telstar Video Entertainment released a VHS game "Catchphrase for all the family" in 1994.

The first DVD game was released in October 2005, and in November 2007, Walker returned to host an all-new interactive DVD game, complete with original theme music and Mr. Chips. Roy Walker also voiced the interactive play along version of Catchphrase on WedigTV.

In January 2012, a Catchphrase game was released on the Apple store for iOS devices.

In May 2013, a new Catchphrase app was released for Android, Apple inc. and Amazon kindle devices. On the Apple store, the app costs £0.69 and a free version of the app that went up to round 4 instead of having all 20 rounds. On 15 March 2014 a new version of the app was released. You played as you did in the TV show. The app cost £1.49. In April 2014 the app was released for free.

On 25 March 2015, a new app called 'Catchphrase Quest' was released. This app is free of charge.

Car Park Catchphrase
In homage to the show, a popular radio parody of Catchphrase, entitled Car Park Catchphrase was broadcast on The Chris Moyles Show on BBC Radio 1 from January 2004 until December 2005. It returned to the airwaves on 8 January 2007. It was taken off the air again because of the phone-in competitions being suspended but later returned. The format in comparison to the TV show slightly changed and required callers to play from their cars and 'honk' their horns when they knew the catchphrase being described. Roy Walker himself records voice samples for the game.

Mr. Chips
The series' original mascot is a golden robot called "Mr. Chips". The figure often appeared in the animations for the catchphrases. Mr. Chips was originally depicted as being quite tall, but as the series progressed, he became a smaller figure. Variations of the mascot sometimes appeared in the animations, such as Mr. Chips with a lemon for a head (for the catchphrase "Lemonheads" on the episode broadcast 2 December 1994). During the closing credits, from 1995–96 (Series 11) until 2001 (Series 15), Mr. Chips was also seen doing things such as climbing a ladder, or comical things. 

Throughout Nick Weir's series of Catchphrase, Mr. Chips was not featured in any of the Catchphrases. Instead, a family of a father, mother, son and two other men appeared. These characters were also featured in the opening sequence, showing the family trying to 'catch' the 'letters' of the phrase "Catchphrase", the family themselves as the letters of "Catch". This family were not as popular as Mr. Chips, but despite this, the family appeared until the series finished in 2002. 
Despite Mr. Chips not appearing in any of the catchphrases throughout Nick Weir's series, he did however, appear in the closing credits throughout Weir's first two series, and also in the graphics for the holiday prize, the spot prize and Cash Countdown throughout Weir's first series as host.

Mr. Chips returned to appearing in the Catchphrases again throughout Mark Curry's series in 2002, alongside the family, and he was also brought back for the current revival series hosted by Stephen Mulhern.

Family Catchphrase

Family Catchphrase was a spin-off from the original series, which aired in 1994 on The Family Channel (now Challenge).

See also
Waffle (1998 game show hosted by Weir before his stint on Catchphrase that has been compared to Catchphrase)

References

External links

1986 British television series debuts
1980s British game shows
1990s British game shows
2000s British game shows
2010s British game shows
2020s British game shows
British television series based on American television series
British television series revived after cancellation
Carlton Television
English-language television shows
ITV game shows
Television series by All3Media
Television series by ITV Studios
Television series by STV Studios
Television shows produced by Television South (TVS)